Fabrizio Lorieri (born 11 February 1964 in Massa) is an Italian professional football coach and a former player who played as a goalkeeper, currently in charge as goalkeeping coach of Spezia.

Playing career
Lorieri spent 11 seasons in the Serie A for 4 different teams (though he never played for his first team, Internazionale), in 7 of those seasons he was the first-choice goalkeeper for his team, playing 192 games in the top-flight division overall.

Managerial career
After his retirement he worked alongside former head coach Luigi Cagni as his assistant at Catanzaro, Empoli and Parma. In 2007 he obtained his UEFA Pro licence at the Centro Tecnico Federale di Coverciano, his dissertation covering the subject of goalkeeping psychology in football.

In 2010 he joined Lecce, a former club of his as a player, as a goalkeeping coach. In 2013, after leaving Lecce, he was hired by Sassuolo as a goalkeeping coach, filling in the role until 2019.

In 2019 he was called by Eusebio Di Francesco to work alongside him at Cagliari as his goalkeeping coach.

In June 2022, he was named Luca Gotti's assistant at Serie A club Spezia. Following the dismissal of Gotti in February 2023, Lorieri was then appointed caretaker coach of Spezia for the upcoming league game against Juventus. He was successively confirmed as a goalkeeping coach following the appointment of Leonardo Semplici as the new first team head coach.

Coaching statistics

References

1964 births
Living people
People from Massa
Italian footballers
Italy under-21 international footballers
Association football goalkeepers
Serie A players
Serie B players
A.C. Prato players
Piacenza Calcio 1919 players
Torino F.C. players
Ascoli Calcio 1898 F.C. players
A.S. Roma players
U.S. Lecce players
U.S. Salernitana 1919 players
Genoa C.F.C. players
Spezia Calcio players
A.S.D. Sangiovannese 1927 players
Sportspeople from the Province of Massa-Carrara
Footballers from Tuscany